The 1965 European Cup final was the final match of the 1964–65 European Cup, the tenth season of Europe's premier club football tournament organized by UEFA. It was played at the San Siro in Milan, Italy, between Italian side Inter Milan and Portuguese side Benfica.

This was the second time a European Cup final was played at one of the finalists home ground. The two finalists had to go through with three rounds of knockout football with Benfica needing to play an extra round in the preliminary defeating Aris Bonnevoie. They also defeated La Chaux-de-Fonds, Real Madrid and Vasas ETO Győr to make the final. Inter defeated Dinamo București, Rangers and Liverpool to make it to the final.

Inter opened the scoring in the 43rd minute from Brazilian winger Jair, to give the Italian club a 1–0 lead at the break. Despite Benfica's best efforts, Inter retained the 1–0 scoreline to claim their second European Cup in a row; this is also the most recent time to date that a side won a final played at their home stadium.

Route to the final

Match

Details

See also
Inter Milan in European football
S.L. Benfica in international football

References

External links
1964–65 season at UEFA website
European Cup History 1965

1
European Cup Final 1965
European Cup Final 1965
European Cup Final 1965
1965
European Cup Final
European Cup Final
Football in Milan
May 1965 sports events in Europe
1960s in Milan
Sports competitions in Milan